Below are the squads for the 2016 COSAFA Cup, which took place from 11 June to 25 June 2016.  The player's age and clubs are as of the opening day of the tournament.  Players marked (c) were named as captain for their national team for the tournament.

Angola
Head coach:

Botswana
Head coach: Peter Butler

Democratic Republic of the Congo
Head coach:

Lesotho
Head coach:

Madagascar
Head coach: Auguste Raux

Malawi
Head coach: Ernest Mtawali

Mauritius
Head coach: Joe Tshupula

Mozambique
Head coach:

Namibia
Head coach: Ricardo Mannetti

Seychelles
Head coach: Ralph Jean-Louis

South Africa
Head coach: Shakes Mashaba

Swaziland
Head coach: Harris Bulunga

Zambia
Head coach: George Lwandamina

Zimbabwe
Head coach: Callisto Pasuwa

References

COSAFA Cup squads